Monte Kay (September 18, 1924 – May 25, 1988) was an American musicians' agent and record producer.

Kay acted as a talent scout and as the musical director of several night clubs on the New York jazz scene in the late 1940s and 1950s. According to some accounts, during those years some thought Kay was a Caucasian due to his fair-skin. Kay always referred to himself as African American although he could pass as Caucasian. In May and June 1945, Mal Braveman and Kay's New Jazz Foundation produced concerts at New York's Town Hall that included Dizzy Gillespie, Pearl Bailey, Erroll Garner, Don Byas, Charlie Parker, Max Roach and Sidney Catlett.  As the artistic director of the Royal Roost (a jazz venue on 52nd Street) he succeeded in persuading the owner, Ralph Watkins, to hire Miles Davis' nonet - sometimes called the "Tuba Band" - with which Davis was pursuing a project that gave birth to the cool jazz movement later to be called Birth of the Cool. Kay befriended Davis and, during his later marriage to singer/actress Diahann Carroll, was for a time  Miles' neighbor.

In 1949 he founded the jazz club Birdland (later, he would also open another jazz club, Le Downbeat, in Chicago). During the 1950s, Kay produced several musicians, including Herbie Mann, Stan Getz, Sonny Rollins and the Modern Jazz Quartet. In the same period he married (1956–1963) singer/actress Diahann Carroll. Their daughter, Suzanne Kay, is a journalist and television author.

In 1963, Kay became the manager of the comedian Flip Wilson. The two formed the record label Little David Records, which featured comedy albums by Wilson, George Carlin and others. Kay was executive producer of the TV show The Flip Wilson Show.

Kay died of heart failure in Los Angeles in 1988.

References

1924 births
1988 deaths
Jazz record producers
Record producers from California
American television producers
20th-century American Jews